Rostamabad-e Kuchak (also Romanized as Rostamābād-e Kūchak; also known as Rostamābād) is a village in Kermajan Rural District, in the Central District of Kangavar County, Kermanshah Province, Iran. At the 2006 census, its population was 512, in 111 families.

References 

Populated places in Kangavar County